Caldithrix is a genus of thermophilic and anaerobic bacteria, currently assigned to its own phylum.

References

Thermophiles
Bacteria genera